Minuscule 580 (in the Gregory-Aland numbering), ε 1291 (von Soden), is a Greek minuscule manuscript of the New Testament, on parchment. Palaeographically it has been assigned to the 12th century.

Description 

The codex contains a complete text of the four Gospels on 385 leaves (size ). It is written in one column per page, 16 lines per page. The words are written continuously without any separation.

According to Scrivener it is a beautiful manuscript.

Text 

The Greek text of the codex is a representative of the Byzantine text-type. Aland placed it in Category V.
According to the Claremont Profile Method it represents the textual family Kx in Luke 1 and Luke 10, but in Luke 20 it belongs to the textual group Π473.

History 

The manuscript was examined and described by Paulin Martin, and by William Hatch.

Scrivener labelled it by 744.

The manuscript currently housed in at the National Library of France (Gr. 119), at Paris.

See also 

 List of New Testament minuscules
 Biblical manuscript
 Textual criticism

References

Further reading 

 W. H. Hatch, Facsimiles and descriptions of minuscule manuscripts of the New Testament (Cambridge, 1951), L.

Greek New Testament minuscules
12th-century biblical manuscripts
Bibliothèque nationale de France collections